John Eachern Smith (6 August 1901 – 28 April 1967) was a Liberal party member of the House of Commons of Canada. He was born in Eldon Township, Ontario and was in the newspaper business as an editor and publisher.

He was first elected to Parliament at the York North riding in the 1945 general election then re-elected in 1949 and 1953. Smith left the House of Commons after his third term, the 22nd Canadian Parliament, and did not seek re-election in 1957.

One of Smith's campaign managers in the 1949 election was Barney Danson, who later became a cabinet minister.

References

External links
 

1901 births
1967 deaths
Canadian newspaper editors
Canadian male journalists
Canadian newspaper reporters and correspondents
Members of the House of Commons of Canada from Ontario
Liberal Party of Canada MPs